"The Shadow of Your Smile", also known as "Love Theme from The Sandpiper", is a popular song. The music was written by Johnny Mandel with the lyrics written by Paul Francis Webster. The song was introduced in the 1965 film The Sandpiper, with a trumpet solo by Jack Sheldon and later became a minor hit for Tony Bennett (Johnny Mandel arranged and conducted his version as well). It won the Grammy Award for Song of the Year and the Academy Award for Best Original Song. In 2004 the song finished at number 77 in AFI's 100 Years...100 Songs poll of the top tunes in American cinema.

Other versions
 Astrud Gilberto – The Shadow of Your Smile (1965)
 Johnny Mandel with Jack Sheldon – The Sandpiper (1965)
 Collage (Brian Bennett / Dave Richmond / Alan Hawkshaw) – Misty (Studio 2 Stereo) (1973)
 Wes Montgomery – Bumpin' (1965)
 Barbra Streisand - My Name Is Barbra, Two... (1965)
 Tony Bennett with Jimmy Rowles – The Movie Song Album (1966)
 Bobby Darin – Bobby Darin Sings The Shadow of Your Smile (1966)
 Hampton Hawes – I'm All Smiles (1966)
 Johnny Mathis – The Shadow of Your Smile (1966)
 Oscar Peterson – Blues Etude (1966)
 Boots Randolph - Monument single 976, reached #93 on the Billboard Hot 100 (1966)
 Pablo Beltrán Ruiz - La Sombra de tu Sonrisa (1966)
 Frank Sinatra and Count Basie – Sinatra at the Sands (1966)
 Ella Fitzgerald – The Voice of Jazz (1966)
 Nancy Sinatra – How Does That Grab You? (1966)
 Sammy Davis Jr. – Sammy Davis Jr. Sings and Laurindo Almeida Plays (1966)
 Bill Evans – Further Conversations with Myself (1967)
 Johnny Smith -  Johnny Smith (1967)
 Clare Fischer – Songs for Rainy Day Lovers (1967)
 Oliver Nelson – Sound Pieces (1967)
 Archie Shepp – One For The Trane, Live in Donaueschingen (1967)
 The Delfonics - La La Means I Love You (1968)
 Engelbert Humperdinck - A Man Without Love (1968)
 Ann Burton – Ballads and Burton (1969)
 Stevie Wonder - My Cherie Amour (1969)
 Baden Powell (guitarist) - Solitude On Guitar (1973)
 Earl Klugh – Earl Klugh (album) Live Version (1976)
 D Train – Music (1983)
 Pieces of a Dream – Imagine This (1983)
 Rita Reys – Memories Of You (1983)
 Udo Lindenberg – Germans / The Shadow Of Your Smile (1984)
 Amsterdam Loeki Stardust Quartet - Extra Time  (1991)
 Salena Jones – In Hollywood - Making Love (1994)
 Benny Carter – New York Nights (1995)
 Marvin Gaye - Vulnerable (1997)
 Hank Jones with Elvin Jones – Someday My Prince Will Come (2002)
 Tony Bennett with Juanes – Duets: An American Classic (2006)
 Jack Sheldon – Listen Up (2006)
 Takuya Kuroda - Edge (2011)
 Bill Frisell – When You Wish Upon a Star (2016)
 Gerry Mulligan – Feelin' Good (1965)
 Herb Alpert & The Tijuana Brass – What Now My Love? (1966)
 Dave Koz – At the Movies (2007)

References 

1965 songs
Songs with lyrics by Paul Francis Webster
Songs with music by Johnny Mandel
Tony Bennett songs
Trini Lopez songs
Frank Sinatra songs
Barbra Streisand songs
Peggy Lee songs
Nancy Wilson (jazz singer) songs
Bobby Darin songs
Perry Como songs
Connie Francis songs
Shirley Bassey songs
Al Hirt songs
Andy Williams songs
Best Original Song Golden Globe winning songs
Best Original Song Academy Award-winning songs
Grammy Award for Song of the Year
Love themes
Eva Cassidy songs